Miss Chinese International Pageant 1998 was held on January 25, 1998 in Hong Kong. The pageant was broadcast live through TVB and was streamed for the first time in Malaysia. Miss Chinese International 1997 Monica Lo of Toronto, Ontario, Canada crowned Louisa Luk of San Francisco, USA as the new winner. Luk is the first winner from the United States and San Francisco's only winner, as of 2010.

Pageant information
The theme to this year's pageant is "Beautiful Shadows from The Land of the Gods, Ten Years of Love from the Dragons" 「神洲儷影  十載龍情」.  This year also marks the tenth anniversary of the Miss Chinese International Pageant.  The Masters of Ceremonies were Eric Tsang, Lydia Shum, and mandopop singer Emil Chau, who also served as the special performing guest.  Other performing guests included cantopop singers Eason Chan, Edmond Leung and Miriam Yeung.

10th anniversary guests
To celebrate the 10th anniversary of the pageant, the organizers invited ten past award winners as special guests, which took part in an opening ceremony for the show.  They included:
Kit Wong 黃美潔 (Sydney, Australia), Miss Chinese International 1989
Mina Pedruco 畢美娜 (Macau), 1989 Second Runner-Up
Yen-Thean Leng 凌緣庭 (Singapore), Miss Chinese International 1991
Siew-Kee Cheng 鍾秀枝 (Singapore), Miss Chinese International 1996
Melissa Ng 吳美珩 (San Francisco, USA), 1996 First Runner-Up
Amy Chung 鍾慧儀 (New York City, USA), 1996 Second Runner-Up
Winnie Yeung 楊婉儀 (Hong Kong), 1996 Miss Friendship
Monica Lo 盧淑儀 (Toronto, Ontario, Canada), Miss Chinese International 1997
San San Lee 李珊珊 (Hong Kong), 1997 First Runner-Up

Results

Special awards
Miss Friendship: May Ling Lai 黎美齡 (Chicago)
Best National Costume: Lisa Vongthong 蔡明真 (Bangkok)
Miss Motherland Beauty: Louisa Luk 陸依薩 (San Francisco)

Viewer's Voting Top 5 delegates
 Linda Chung 鍾玲玲 (Los Angeles)
 Joey Tan 陳英麗 (Kuala Lumpur)
 Cecilia Wang 王瑾 (Calgary)
 Virginia Yung 翁嘉穗 (Hong Kong)
 Dina Goh 戈婷 (Vancouver)

Contestant list

Crossovers
Contestants who previously competed or will be competing at other international beauty pageants:

Miss World
 1997:  Macau  : Agnes LO

Miss Universe
 1998: : Virginia Yung

External links
 Johnny's Pageant Page - Miss Chinese International Pageant 1998
 

TVB
1998 beauty pageants
1998 in Hong Kong
Beauty pageants in Hong Kong
Miss Chinese International Pageants